Taurotettix elegans is a species of hoppers in the tribe Cicadulini. It is found in Asia (China, Kazakhstan, Kyrgyzstan, Mongolia, Russia, Tajikistan, Turkey, Turkmenistan, Uzbekistan).

References

External links 

 
 Taurotettix elegans at insectoid.info
 Callistrophia elegans at the Museum National d'Histoire Naturelle, Paris
 Callistrophia elegans at bionames.org
 "Taurotettix elegans" at speciesfile.org

Athysanini
Insects described in 1900